Giles Gering ( 16th century) was a notable artist at the court of Henry VIII of England.

Although not as sought-after as Hans Holbein the Younger, he was considered to be in the same category as William Scrots, John Bettes and Levina Teerlinc.

References

Year of birth missing
Year of death missing
English artists
16th-century English artists